Pablo Marcelo Buabse (born 27 March 1963 in San Miguel de Tucumán) is a former Argentine rugby union player. He played as a lock and as a flanker.

Buabse played for local team of Los Tarcos Rugby Club.

He had 7 caps for Argentina, from 1989 to 1995, without scoring. He was called for the 1991 Rugby World Cup, playing a game, and for the 1995 Rugby World Cup, but this time never leaving the bench.

References

External links

1963 births
Living people
Argentine rugby union players
Argentina international rugby union players
Rugby union locks
Rugby union hookers
Sportspeople from San Miguel de Tucumán